MacDonnell, Macdonnell, or McDonnell is a surname of Scottish and Irish origin. It is an anglicized form of the Gaelic patronymic Mac Dhòmhnaill, meaning "son of Dòmhnall". The Gaelic personal name Dòmhnall is a Gaelicised form of the name Donald, which is composed of the elements domno, meaning "world", and val, meaning "might" or "rule". The name is considered a variation of MacDonald. 

MacDonnells are found in both Scottish and Irish nobility, where they have held an important role in the history of both countries.

A
 Alasdair McDonnell (born 1949), Northern Irish politician and MP from Cushendall
 Alestair Ruadh MacDonnell (1725–1761), Scottish chief of Glengarry, secret agent and spy on Prince Charles Edward after 1750
 Alexander McDonnell, 9th Earl of Antrim (1935–2021), British peer from Northern Ireland
 Alexander McDonnell (chess player) (1798–1835), Irish chess master
 Alexander McDonnell (engineer) (1829–1904), locomotive designer and Chief Mechanical Engineer
 Sir Alexander McDonnell, 1st Baronet (1794–1875), Anglo-Irish civil servant, commissioner of national education in Ireland
 Andy McDonnell (1882–1942), Australian rules footballer
 Angus McDonnell (1881–1966), English politician and MP from Dartford
 Antony MacDonnell, 1st Baron MacDonnell (1844–1925), Irish-born British politician, involved in the administration of India

B
 Bernard C. McDonnell (1911–1959), New York assemblyman
 Bob McDonnell (born 1954), governor of Virginia; American politician
 Barry McDonnell  (born 1944), Lord of Glencoe, Scotland

C
 Charles James McDonnell (1928-2020), American Roman Catholic bishop
 Charlie McDonnell British musician and YouTube personality (charlieissocoollike)
 Clare McDonnell (born 1967), English radio broadcaster and presenter
 Clark W. McDonnell (1870–1952), American politician from North Dakota

D
 Dan McDonnell (born c. 1970), American college baseball coach

E
 E. T. MacDonnell (fl. 1917–1918), American college football coach at Wake Forest University
 Eugene McDonnell (born 1926), American programming language designer

F
 Lady Flora McDonnell (born 1963), artist, illustrator, and author of children's books; daughter of Alexander McDonnell

G
 George Alcock MacDonnell (1830–1899), Irish chess master
 George Macdonell (British Army officer) (1780–1870), British Army officer

J
 James MacDonnell (1884–1973), Canadian soldier, lawyer, and politician from Ontario
 James MacKerras Macdonnell (1884–1973), Canadian lawyer and parliamentarian from Ontario
 James Macdonnell (1781–1857), Scottish military officer; fought at the Battle of Waterloo
 James Smith McDonnell (1899–1980), American businessman and aviation pioneer; founder of McDonnell Aircraft, later McDonnell-Douglas
 James McDonnell (born 1961), American musician better known as Slim Jim Phantom
 Joe McDonnell (ice hockey) (born 1961), Canadian professional ice hockey player
 Joe McDonnell (rugby player) (born 1973), New Zealand rugby union player
 Joe McDonnell (hunger striker) (1951–1981), Irish member of the Provisional IRA; died in IRA hunger strike
 John McDonnell (businessman) (born 1938), American aviation businessman, son of James Smith McDonnell
 John McDonnell (coach) (1938–2021), Irish-American college football coach
 John McDonnell (footballer) (born 1965), Irish football manager
 John McDonnell (politician) (born 1951), British politician and MP
 Johnny McDonnell (fl. 1908–1912), Irish footballer

K
 Kyle MacDonnell (c. 1922-2004), American model, singer, and actress

L
 Lara McDonnell (born 2003), Irish actress
Leverne McDonnell (1963–2013), Australian actress
 Louisa McDonnell, Countess of Antrim (1855–1949), British peer
 Luke McDonnell (born 1959), American comic book artist and toy designer

M
 Máel Sechnaill mac Domnaill (949–1022), High King of Ireland.
 Mary McDonnell (born 1952), American film, stage, and television actress
 Megan McDonnell, American screenwriter
 Michael McDonnell (contemporary), American trial lawyer, radio commentator, and professor of law
 Moylan McDonnell (born 1889, d. unknown), Canadian professional hockey player

N
 Noelie McDonnell, Irish singer/songwriter
 Norman Macdonnell (1916–1979), American radio and television producer
 Neil MacDonnell, a blunt instrument used in Walton, happens to have a doppleganger named Spencer

P
 Pat McDonnell (born 1950), Irish hurler
 Patrick McDonnell (contemporary), Irish actor and comedian
 Patrick McDonnell (born 1956), American comic book author
 Percy McDonnell (1858–1896), Australian cricketer
 Peter McDonnell (born 1953), English professional football player

R
 Randal MacDonnell, 1st Earl of Antrim (d. 1636), Irish nobleman, 4th son of Sorley Boy MacDonnell
 Randal MacDonnell, 1st Marquess of Antrim (1609–1683), Roman Catholic landed magnate in Scotland and Ireland
 Ray MacDonnell (1928–2021), American actor
 Richard Graves MacDonnell (1814–1881), Anglo-Irish lawyer, judge, and colonial governor
 Roger MacDonnell, New Zealand advertising entrepreneur

S
 Samuel McDonnell (1834–1910), Canadian politician from Nova Scotia
 Sanford N. McDonnell (born 1922), American aviation businessman, nephew of James Smith McDonnell
 Shannon McDonnell (born 1987), Australian rugby league player
 Sophie McDonnell (born 1976), British television presenter
 Sorley Boy MacDonnell (Somhairle Buidh Mac Domhnaill) (1505–1590), Irish clan chieftain of the Clan MacDonnell
 Stephen McDonnell (hurler) (born 1989), Irish hurler for Glen Rovers and Cork
 Steven McDonnell (Gaelic footballer) (born 1979), Gaelic football player for Armagh

T
 Terrence McDonnell (contemporary), American screenwriter
 Thomas McDonnell, Snr. (1788–1864), Irish-New Zealand businessman
 Thomas McDonnell (1831–1899), New Zealand military officer and writer
 Timothy A. McDonnell (born 1937), American Roman Catholic priest and bishop
 Tony McDonnell (professor) (contemporary), British Professor of Planetary and Space Sciences
 Tony McDonnell (born 1976), Irish football player

W
 William McDonnell, 6th Earl of Antrim (1851–1918), British peer
 William McDonnell (1876–1941), American sport shooter and 1912 Olympic contestant

See also
 Clan MacDonnell of Glengarry, branch of the Scottish Clan Donald, now predominantly in Canada due to mass negotiation of immigration during the Highland Clearances
 Clan MacDonald of Keppoch, branch of Clan Donald, who are sometimes referred to as MacDonnells.
 Clan MacDonald of Dunnyveg, branch of the Scottish Clan Donald, where they are sometimes referred to as MacDonnells.
 Clan MacDonnell of Antrim, Irish branch of the Scottish Clan Donald

References

Gaelic-language surnames
Patronymic surnames
Surnames from given names